Luca Fiuzzi (born 29 August 1984) is an Italian footballer.

Biography
Fiuzzi started his career at Empoli F.C. Fiuzzi joined Cuoiopelli Cappiano in temporary deal in 2004–05 season. In the next 2 seasons Fiuzzi joined the club in co-ownership deal. In June 2007 Empoli bought back Fiuzzi. Fiuzzi spent 2007–08 and 2008–09 season in temporary deal in Reggiana and Foligno.

In 2009, Fiuzzi left for Monza in another co-ownership deal. In June 2011 Empoli gave up the remain 50% registration rights for free.

Italian football scandal
On 18 June 2012 he was banned 4 years due to 2011–12 Italian football scandal. His final appeal was partially accepted by Tribunale Nazionale di Arbitrato per lo Sport of CONI on 21 March, which his ban was reduced to 1 year (from June 2012 to June 2013).

References

External links
 

Italian footballers
Empoli F.C. players
A.C. Reggiana 1919 players
A.S.D. Città di Foligno 1928 players
A.C. Monza players
Association football defenders
People from Imperia
1984 births
Living people
Footballers from Liguria
Sportspeople from the Province of Imperia